XHSCAT-FM is a community radio station on 107.5 FM serving Villa de Álvarez, Colima City, Comala, Coquimatlán and Cuauhtémoc in the Mexican state of Colima. The station is owned by Organización de Radios Comunitarias de Occidente, A.C., which also serves as a national organization representing community radio stations.

History
Organización de Radios Comunitarias de Occidente filed for a community station on October 13, 2016. The station was awarded on April 11, 2018.

References

External links
Colima Radio Facebook
Orc Mexico Website

Radio stations in Colima
Community radio stations in Mexico
Radio stations established in 2019